This is a list of writers who have worked  in the Leonese language (Llingua Llïonesa in Leonese), a language developed from Vulgar Latin with contributions from the pre-Roman languages which were spoken in the territory of the Spanish provinces of León, Zamora, and Salamanca and in some villages in the District of Bragança, Portugal. The Leonese language belongs to the Leonese or Astur-Leonese subgroup of Iberian languages.

 Caitano Bardón (1881–1924)
 Eva González (1918–2007)
 Severiano Álvarez (born 1933)

See also 

 Leonese language 
 Cuentos del Sil

External links 
 Cuentos del Sil website (in Leonese language)
 Leonese Language Association from El Bierzo (in Leonese language)
 Leonese Language Association "El Fueyu" (in Leonese language and English)
 Top Level Domain for Leonese Language (Leonese language, English, Italian, Catalan, French Romanian, and other languages)

References

Leonese language
Leonese